Kond Rud (also Romanized as Kond Rūd; also known as Kand Roodé Arvanagh, Kondor, Kondo Rūd, Kondūr, Kundur, Kyundur, and Sarkand Rūd) is a village in Mishu-e Jonubi Rural District, Sufian District, Shabestar County, East Azerbaijan Province, Iran. At the 2006 census, its population was 580, in 187 families.

References 

Populated places in Shabestar County